Goryachy Klyuch is the name of several inhabited localities in Russia.

Modern localities
Urban localities
Goryachy Klyuch, Krasnodar Krai, a town in Krasnodar Krai; 

Rural localities
Goryachy Klyuch, Irkutsky District, Irkutsk Oblast, a settlement in Irkutsky District of Irkutsk Oblast
Goryachy Klyuch, Zalarinsky District, Irkutsk Oblast, a village in Zalarinsky District of Irkutsk Oblast
Goryachy Klyuch, Omsk Oblast, a settlement in Druzhinsky Rural Okrug of Omsky District in Omsk Oblast

Alternative names
Goryachy Klyuch, alternative name of Talaya, an urban-type settlement in Khasynsky District of Magadan Oblast;